Alcea rugosa, the Russian hollyhock, is a species of flowering plant in the family Malvaceae. It is native to Ukraine, Crimea, south European Russia, and the Caucasus, and has been introduced as a garden escapee into Wisconsin and Maryland in the United States. It is resistant to Puccinia malvacearum rust, and hardy to USDA zone 4.

References

rugosa
Flora of Ukraine
Flora of the Crimean Peninsula
Flora of South European Russia
Flora of the Caucasus
Plants described in 1862